The 1950 Bristol South East by-election was a by-election held on 30 November 1950 for the British House of Commons constituency of Bristol South East in the city of Bristol.  The seat had become vacant when the constituency's Labour Member of Parliament (MP) Sir Stafford Cripps had resigntion from Parliament due to ill-health.

The Labour candidate Tony Benn held the seat for his party. It was the first of four by-election victories for Benn in the course of his 45-year career in Parliament, the others being Bristol South East in 1961, Bristol South East in 1963 and Chesterfield in 1984.

Votes

See also 
 Tony Benn
 Bristol South East constituency
 1961 Bristol South East by-election
 1963 Bristol South East by-election
 Lists of United Kingdom by-elections

References 

South East
1950 in England
1950 elections in the United Kingdom
Tony Benn
1950s in Bristol